Justin Karn (born June 16, 1981) is a Canadian judoka who represented Canada in Judo at the 2012 Paralympics in the -60 kg category. He was eliminated from the tournament in repêchage due to disqualification by penalties (four shido leading to hansoku make) in his match against South Korea's Min-Jae Lee. Karn has been competing in Judo for around 18 years, and in 2011 won bronze in the -60 kg category of the Parapan American Games.  He was born with aniridia, an eye condition that left him without irises, and also has astigmatism and mutated corneas in both eyes.

See also
Judo in Ontario
Judo in Canada
List of Canadian judoka

References

External links

Video
Canadian Paralympic Committee "Super Athlete" profile of Karn with two videos (CPC on YouTube)

1981 births
Canadian male judoka
Judoka at the 2012 Summer Paralympics
Living people
Medalists at the 2011 Parapan American Games
Paralympic judoka of Canada
Sportspeople from Guelph
20th-century Canadian people
21st-century Canadian people